SM U-135 was a German Type U 127 U-boat of the Imperial German Navy during World War I.

History
Built at the Kaiserliche Werft Danzig, the U-boat was laid down on 4 November 1916, launched on 8 September 1917 and commissioned 20 June 1918.

In November 1918, U-135 was ordered to help put down the German Navy mutiny at Wilhelmshaven.

U-135 was seen by later submarine designers as an excellent design.

She was surrendered to the Allies at Harwich on 21 November 1918 in accordance with the requirements of the Armistice with Germany. Taken over by the UK, the boat was taken to Devonport, where her engines and various other items of equipment were stripped by a team of 25 students led by Technical Officer Richard Finney [1888-1953] under the auspices of J. F. Driver from the then Loughborough College. This equipment was reassembled initially in a wooden hut in Packe Street, Loughborough, and later in a purpose built generating station opened in 1937. They were finally taken out of use, and replaced, in 1949. Finally, on 30 June 1921, the hulk was towed out to sea and sunk by gunfire from the submarines HMS/M L21 and L52, in company with U-161.

References

Notes

Citations

Bibliography

Type U 127 submarines
U-boats commissioned in 1918
World War I submarines of Germany
Loughborough University
1917 ships
Ships built in Danzig